Notodelphyidae is a family of copepods belonging to the order Cyclopoida.

Genera

Genera:
 Achelidelphys Lafargue & Laubier, 1977
 Adenaplostoma Stock, 1993
 Anoplodelphys Lafargue & Laubier, 1978

References

Copepods